Together Through Life is the 33rd studio album by singer-songwriter Bob Dylan, released on April 28, 2009, by Columbia Records. The release of the album, which reached number 1 in multiple countries, was unexpected and surprised fans. Dylan co-wrote most of the songs with Robert Hunter and recorded with musicians including Tom Petty and the Heartbreakers' Mike Campbell and Los Lobos' David Hidalgo. The album was recorded at Jackson Browne's Groove Masters studio in Santa Monica, California and produced by Dylan himself under the pseudonym Jack Frost.

Composition and recording

In a conversation with music journalist Bill Flanagan, published on Bob Dylan's official website at the time of the album's release, Dylan said that the genesis of the record came when French film director Olivier Dahan asked him to supply a song for his new road movie, My Own Love Song, which became "Life is Hard". Indeed, according to Dylan biographer Clinton Heylin, "Dahan was keen to get a whole soundtrack's worth of songs from the man" – and "then the record sort of took its own direction".

Dylan wrote all but one of the album's songs with Grateful Dead lyricist Robert Hunter, with whom he had previously co-written two songs on his 1988 album Down in the Groove. In an interview with Rolling Stone magazine, Dylan commented on the collaboration: “Hunter is an old buddy, we could probably write a hundred songs together if we thought it was important or the right reasons were there... He's got a way with words and I do too. We both write a different type of song than what passes today for songwriting”. The only other writers Dylan has collaborated with to such a degree are Jacques Levy, with whom he wrote most of the songs on Desire in 1976, and Helena Springs, with whom he co-wrote a plethora of songs in the late 1970s (although the majority of them remain unrecorded or unreleased).

Dan Engler, writing in the Verde Independent, noted, "Bob Dylan claimed he could feel the presence of Buddy Holly while recording his landmark album Time Out of Mind in 1997. On his latest disc, Together Through Life, you get the feeling the ghost of old Dylan chum Doug Sahm was haunting the recording sessions". In their book Bob Dylan All the Songs: The Story Behind Every Track, authors Philippe Margotin and Jean-Michel Guesdon note that Sahm "embodied the long history of American popular music, from blues to Tex-Mex. It is to this history that Dylan referred when he composed Together Through Life." Dylan is backed on the album by his regular touring band plus guitarist Mike Campbell of Tom Petty and the Heartbreakers and David Hidalgo of Los Lobos (whose accordion playing on many of the album's tracks caused critics to describe it as possessing a "south of the border" feel). Dylan commented on Campbell's guitar work in his interview with Flanagan, "He's good with me. He's been playing with Tom for so long that he hears everything from a songwriter's point of view and he can play most any style".

Release and promotion
News of the album first broke in a Rolling Stone article on March 4, 2009, the month before the album's release. Critic David Fricke described it as a "dark new disc with a bluesy border-town feel" and quoted a source close to Dylan's camp as saying the album "came as a surprise". A follow-up article in Rolling Stone on March 16 claimed the album contained "struggling love songs" and had little similarity to Dylan's previous album, 2006's Modern Times.

The album's opening track and lead single, "Beyond Here Lies Nothin'", was made available as a free download on Dylan's official website from March 30 to March 31, and a music video for the song, consisting of a montage of Bruce Davidson's photographs, premiered on Amazon on April 21. A second music video for the song, directed by Nash Edgerton, premiered on the website of the Independent Film Channel on May 12, 2009. Edgerton's video sparked controversy because of its depiction of extreme violence.

Artwork
The album's cover features a black-and-white photograph of a young couple in the back seat of a car taken by photographer Bruce Davidson in 1959. The photo had previously been used on the cover of American author Larry Brown's short story collection Big Bad Love. The back cover photograph of gypsy musicians was taken by Josef Koudelka in 1968. The inner sleeve pictures of Dylan and band in the studio were taken by Danny Clinch. The package design is credited to Coco Shinomiya.

Sources and quotations
As with many of his previous albums, Dylan took words and music from a wide array of sources and incorporated them into his own songs on Together Through Life. The phrase "If you ever go to Houston, you better walk right", for example, is taken from the folk song "Midnight Special" (Dylan played harmonica on Harry Belafonte's 1962 recording of the song); and Willie Dixon's "I Just Want to Make Love to You" was the clear musical template for "My Wife's Hometown", resulting in Dixon receiving a co-writing credit on Dylan's song. In their 2009 interview, Flanagan suggested a similarity of the new record to the sound of Chess Records and Sun Records, which Dylan acknowledged as an effect of "the way the instruments were played".

Reception

Critical reception of the album was favorable. The record maintains a score of 76/100 at critic aggregator Metacritic ("Generally favorable reviews"). During the Flanagan interview, Dylan gave his own thoughts about how the record would be received: "I know my fans will like it. Other than that, I have no idea".

Rolling Stone gave the album 4 stars out of 5. Describing the album as a "murky-sounding, often perplexing record", David Fricke of Rolling Stone writes, "Dylan, who turns 68 in May, has never sounded as ravaged, pissed off and lusty". BBC noted that the album is "a masterful reading of 20th century American folk, albeit shot through with some mischievous lyrical twists" and compares it to "some Chicago urban blues tribute". According to Mojo, "Together Through Life is an album that gets its hooks in early and refuses to let go". The reviewer described it as "dark yet comforting". Uncut and Blender both gave the album 5 stars out of 5, saying that it was "unbelievably good".

Corey DuBrowa of Paste Magazine, in his 8.10/10 review, stated:
"Dylan's never spent much time contemplating the rearview mirror, but Together Through Life finds him more resolutely focused on the treacherous horizon than ever before: Song after song decries the mess we're in (the sneering, sarcastic jump-blues 'It's All Good,' in which Dylan's ravaged voice attacks the clichéd phrase as if it represented every banker, politician and Ponzi-scheme cheat he could conjure; 'My Wife's Home Town,' a bluesy jaunt that surveys the current economic wreckage as if from the passenger-side window of a car up on blocks) without forsaking the idea that love—and the comfort we find in shared misery—is essentially all we have left when a lifetime of ambition and achievement are swept away by the winds of change. You'd have to go all the way back to 1974’s Planet Waves—which Dylan summarized as 'cast-iron songs & torch ballads'—to find a record on which he sounds so simultaneously anxious and enervated. Indeed, when Dylan croaks in 'I Feel a Change Comin’ On,' '[I’ve] got the blood of the land in my voice,' you can hear quite plainly the sadness, disappointment and exhaustion of which he sings".

The album received two Grammy Award nominations in 2010: "Best Americana Album" and "Best Solo Rock Vocal Performance" for "Beyond Here Lies Nothin'".

Versions
The album is available as a one-CD version containing only the new material that Dylan recorded, or as a 3-disc deluxe version including the album itself, the "Friends & Neighbors" episode of Theme Time Radio Hour and a DVD featuring an interview with Dylan's first manager Roy Silver (recorded for the Martin Scorsese documentary No Direction Home, but unused).

There is also a two-LP deluxe vinyl version, containing the same songs as the CD. In the US, the CD is included as part of the vinyl package.

Track listing
Disc one

When pre-ordered from iTunes, consumers also got a bonus track of a studio rehearsal of "Lay Lady Lay" recorded in 1969.

Disc two
Theme Time Radio Hour: Friends & Neighbors

Disc three

Personnel
Bob Dylan – guitar, keyboards, vocals, production
Robert Hunter – lyricist

Additional musicians
Mike Campbell – guitar, mandolin
Tony Garnier – bass guitar, upright bass
Donnie Herron – steel guitar, banjo, mandolin, trumpet
David Hidalgo – accordion, guitar
George Receli – drums

Technical personnel
David Bianco – recording, mixing
Eddy Schreyer – mastering
Bill Lane – assistant engineering
Rafael Serrano – engineering
David Spreng – engineering
Rich Tosti – assistant engineering

Charts
The album debuted at number 1 in several countries, including the U.S. and the UK. It was Dylan's first chart-topping album in Britain since New Morning in 1970. The album debuted at number 1 on the Billboard 200, selling 125,000 copies in its first week of release. It then reached number 1 on the Top Internet Album, Top Digital Album, Tastemaker, Top Rock Album, and Most Comprehensive Album listings. In the U.S. the album has sold more than 300,000 copies by August 2009.

Weekly charts

Year-end charts

Certifications and sales

!scope="row"|Worldwide
|
|1,000,000
|-

Notes

References

External links
Lyrics at Bob Dylan's official site
Chords at Dylanchords

2009 albums
Bob Dylan albums
Albums produced by Bob Dylan
Blues rock albums by American artists
Columbia Records albums